James Rayside (April 1836 – 1895) was an Ontario, Canada, businessman and political figure. He represented Glengarry in the Legislative Assembly of Ontario from 1882 to 1894 as a Liberal member.

Biography
Rayside was born in Montreal in 1836, the son of Scottish immigrants, and was raised by his grandparents in Martintown, Upper Canada. He learned the trade of carpentry and became a millwright. He travelled to British Columbia in 1862 during the gold rush there. In 1864, he returned to Martintown, where he married Margaret McDougall. Rayside became involved in the lumber trade and owned a number of sawmills. He served as reeve of Charlottenburg Township. He was defeated by Donald Macmaster for a seat in the provincial assembly in 1878 but was elected in an 1882 by-election held after Macmaster ran for seat in the federal parliament. In 1880, he moved to Lancaster.

External links 
The Canadian parliamentary companion, 1883 JA Gemmill

A Cyclopæedia of Canadian biography : being chiefly men of the time ... GM Rose (1886)
Stormont, Dundas and Glengarry : a history, 1784-1945, JG Harkness (1946)

1836 births
1895 deaths
Ontario Liberal Party MPPs
People from the United Counties of Stormont, Dundas and Glengarry